Modular constructivism is a style of sculpture that emerged in the 1950s and 1960s and was associated especially with Erwin Hauer and Norman Carlberg. It is based on carefully structured modules which allow for intricate and in some cases infinite patterns of repetition, sometimes used to create limitless, basically planar, screen-like formations, and sometimes employed to make more multidimensional structures. Designing these structures involves intensive study of the combinatorial possibilities of sometimes quite curvilinear and fluidly shaped modules, creating a seamless, quasi-organic unity that can be either rounded and self-enclosed, or open and potentially infinite. The latter designs have proved useful and attractive for use in eye-catching architectural walls and screens, often featuring complex patterns of undulating, tissue-like webbing, with apertures which transmit and filter light, while generating delicate patterns of shadow.

Writing in Architecture Week (August 4, 2004), Hauer explains that "Continuity and potential infinity have been at the very center of my sculpture from early on."  Hauer made an extensive study of biomorphic form, especially what he calls "saddle surfaces," which combine convex and concave curvature and thus allow for smooth self-combination, sometimes in multiple dimensions. Another inspiration is the sculpture of Henry Moore, with its fluid curves and porosity.

Hauer's enthusiasm caught the imagination of his colleague at Yale, Norman Carlberg. Both were devoted students of the arch-formalist Josef Albers. Indeed, from the beginning, there was in this modular approach to sculpture an implicit formalism and even minimalism which held itself aloof from some of the other artistic trends of the time, such as the pop art and post-modernism that were just beginning to emerge. As Carlberg recalls, within his artistic circle "you analysed, you looked at something, but you looked at it formally just for what it was and the message was almost always out of it."

See also
Constructivism (art)
Serial art

References
 Galerie Chalette. Structured sculpture : December 1960-January 1961 (New York City : The Gallery, 1960) [exhibition catalogue] OCLC 6027697
 Carlberg, Norman. Norman Carlberg : an exhibition of sculpture [exhibition catalogue] (Exhibition of sculpture : Norman Carlberg : presented by the Pennsylvania State University College of Arts and Architecture, November 5-November 29, 1966) OCLC 81988058; OCLC 82275454  
 Hauer, Erwin. Erwin Hauer : Continua - architectural screens and walls by Erwin Hauer (New York : Princeton Architectural ; London : Hi Marketing, 2004) 
 Montpelier Cultural Arts Center.  Sculpture 2000 : the twentieth anniversary of the Montpelier invitational sculpture exhibition, Montpelier Cultural Arts Center, June 8 - August 18, 2000 [exhibition catalogue] (Maryland : Montpelier Cultural Arts Center, 2000) OCLC 49254937
Museum of Modern Art (New York, N.Y.). Recent sculpture U.S.A. Sponsored by the Junior Council of the Museum of Modern Art (New York, 1959) OCLC 1097018
 Philadelphia Museum College of Art; Paul Darrow;  Ed Rossbach;  Walter Reinsel; Antonio Frasconi; Herb Lubalin; Helen Borten; Henry Mitchell;  Erwin Hauer; John Mason; Lenore Tawney. Directors' choice : an exhibition at the Philadelphia Museum College of Art, Broad and Pine Streets, January 14 through February 7, 1961 (Philadelphia, Pa. : [Philadelphia Museum College of Art], 1961) OCLC 49120005

External links
Erwin Hauer Studios homepage, with Hauer bio
New Arts Gallery information on Erwin Hauer including COLOR IMAGES
Information on Erwin Hauer Studios from architonic.com 
Article: "Screens to Infinity", by Erwin Hauer, Architecture Week, (4 August 2004)
COLOR IMAGES of large modular sculpture by Carlberg  at Riverside Centre, built by Harry Seidler and Associates in Brisbane, Australia
Marylandartsource.com page on Norman Carlberg, including some comment by the artist on the modular constructivist style

Art movements
Constructivism
History of sculpture
Modernist sculpture
Constructivism